From the Beginning may refer to:

"From the Beginning" (song), a 1972 song by Emerson, Lake & Palmer
From the Beginning (box set), a box set by Emerson, Lake & Palmer
From the Beginning (Small Faces album), 1967
From the Beginning (Deniece Williams album), 1990
From the Beginning, an album by Yolandita Monge
From the Beginning, an album by The Damned